Zombie Cafe is a freemium mobile simulation video game created by American Capcom subsidiary Beeline Interactive, Inc. It was released for iOS platforms on January 26, 2011, and was formerly on Google Play for Android. 

Zombie Cafe is a game in which players run a café by cooking dishes and serving customers with the help of zombies. Players can turn customers into zombies, who become employees. Players gain experience by cooking and serving dishes. There are a variety of menu items, each differing in price, number of servings, and time to cook.  As the restaurant builds up savings, the player can purchase recipes and furnishings, and can infect more customers. The player can also purchase pets and expand their restaurant. Along with growing the business, players can send their zombies to raid enemy cafés to obtain new recipes.

Gameplay
The staff in the restaurant is made up of zombies. The restaurant's customers can be transformed into zombies to serve food and take up dirty plates, but the player must not overwork their zombies. If their Energy levels get too low, they will start attacking customers, lowering the café's rating. A low-Energy zombie must rest for a period of time, alternatively, the player can instantly replenish the zombie's Energy with a currency called Toxin.

Dishes
Dishes are the main source of income in Zombie Cafe. Dishes vary by cooking time, cost, number of servings, and amount of Experience points given. While cooking, the player spends money on the dish, then waits a certain amount of time before serving it to the customers. Dishes can be looted during raids for free, and new recipes can be unlocked. New recipes will then end up in the player's fridge from which they can either serve or unlock them. Dishes require a chef or zombie to be cooked, but can be paused and resumed at any time. If the player leaves a stove unattended for a long enough time or ignores it after it is finished cooking, it will burn.

There are 9 different dish variations: Spicy, Very Spicy, Fancy, Very Fancy, Bulk, Fresh, Frozen, Quick, and Very Quick. These special variations are more valuable than their normal counterparts. Each can be unlocked through enemy raid cafés or through a friend's café (if already unlocked by the player's friends).

To defeat a café, the zombies must defeat the raid boss. Players can also have their zombies retreat by clicking/tapping on a white flag icon on the upper left hand corner. If unsuccessful, the player does not receive the recipe but can receive Cash if the zombies eat the customers or employees.

Customers
Customers are the people who consume the dishes and give money to the player. There are many types of customers with varying appearance, gender and occupation. Customers can be human or appear as supernatural beings such as mummies, vampires, aliens, superheros, deities, and legendary creatures. Some characters in the game are based on living persons. The Japanese version has characters from the Mega Man series. The type of customer that visits the café depends on the player's level and the café's current rating. Every customer has a "zombie form", so the player can infect any patron they want to work for the chef. The ones first encountered from the tutorial are usually free. Later on, new customers will appear with varying prices, some in coins but most in Toxin.

Café rating
The café rating shows the reputation of the player's café, indicated by stars on the upper left hand corner. The higher a café's rating, the more popular a café becomes. This way more customers will appear. When customers finish their food and give you money, thought bubbles appear above their heads to indicate their feelings about the service, which affect ratings. By making customers happy, the star rating will increase and more customers will show up, giving the chef more cash. If customers aren't satisfied or are attacked by an Energy-deprived zombie, the café rating will drop, affecting its popularity and causing less customers will appear. A café should have enough seats and number of dishes to accommodate customers. Depending on the size of the café, the player may need more seats, more utilities, and more zombie servers to speed up the serving process. Certain items from the store will grant your café a rating bonus. Green blinking stars indicate that a café rating had just gone up during a player's absence and red blinking stars indicate that the café rating is now lower than it used to be.

There is a feature from Zombie Cafe which functions similar to reviews. It becomes available when the player's café reaches level 6. By completing four tasks in the "to do" list, the chef's café rating will gain a purple bonus star. Up to three bonus stars can be obtained, and they will only drop with the pass of time. The tasks are selected randomly from either raiding, serving, cooking, spending money on your café, collecting fees from friends. If the player has friends playing the game, the tasks will shift towards doing business involving their friends. After completing the four objectives, the player will gain one bonus star and a review will be shown. The player can also bribe the reviewer to complete the tasks by using 2 Toxin for each incomplete objective. The purple stars last temporarily, maxing out at 3 stars.

Influence
The game is influenced by Dungeons & Dragons style role-playing games. In addition to money, the player earns experience points for the restaurant. As the restaurant gains experience points, it goes up in levels, and the player is allowed to add new zombies to the staff.  New levels also unlock new recipes and new items available for installation in the restaurant.

As a unique twist on the SIM model, the zombie staff can be sent out to attack and raid other restaurants.  If victorious, they will bring back food to either serve in the restaurant, without the time or expense of cooking it, or add to the menu to be cooked whenever the player chooses.

In-app purchases
Zombie Cafe offers in-app purchases.

Controversy
The game was part of a lawsuit filed against Apple Inc. Children were using their parents' devices to play games and used the in-app purchase options, costing their parents a lot of money. Zombie Cafe was one of the games that children had used to run up expenses. As a result of the lawsuit, Apple made in-app purchases only accessible through a security check.

Collaborations
In 2014, Capcom made collaborations with Zombie Café, having characters from the Mega Man, Ghosts 'n Goblins and Gaist Crusher series appear in the Japanese version of the game for a limited time.

Critical reception

Zombie Cafe has received positive reviews since its release. The game received 9.0 out of 10 by App Store customer ratings and Appolicious. HiTPhone gave it 8.0, Gamezebo's Jim Squires gave it a 7.0. Slide To Play and GameRankings gave it a lower score of 5.0 out of 10.

References

External links
http://www.beeline-i.com
Zombie Cafe Japan (official Facebook page)

Android (operating system) games
IOS games
Business simulation games
2011 video games
Video games developed in the United States
Video games about zombies